Reveal is the twelfth studio album by American alternative rock band R.E.M., released on May 14, 2001, on Warner Bros. After having adjusted to former drummer Bill Berry's departure and releasing Up to mixed response in 1998, R.E.M. released the more upbeat Reveal, co-produced with long-time collaborator Patrick McCarthy. The album received generally positive reviews from music critics.

In 2002, R.E.M. allowed each track of the album to be remixed by different producers and members of the music industry. The resulting remix album, r.e.m.IX, was available as a free download from R.E.M.'s official website. In 2005, Warner Bros. Records issued an expanded two-disc edition of Reveal which includes a CD and a DVD, as well as the original CD booklet with expanded liner notes.

Music 
After the electronic experimental direction of Up (1998), Reveal was referred to by Stephen Thomas Erlewine of AllMusic as "a conscious return to their classic sound," although Matt LeMay of Pitchfork noticed that Reveal relies "more heavily on synthesized sounds than any of their past albums" with an "increased reliance on burbling, jittering synthesizers". Erlewine himself later acknowledged the album is "heavy on keyboards," whilst Pitchforks Stephen M. Deusner said it was "effects-heavy."

The lead single, "Imitation of Life", became a UK Top 10 hit as well as the band's first number one single in Japan, but floundered at the bottom of the U.S. singles charts. Additional singles from Reveal were "All the Way to Reno (You're Gonna Be a Star)" and "I'll Take the Rain". Building on examples from their previous album Up, "Beat a Drum", "Summer Turns to High", and "Beachball" are musical homages to The Beach Boys, of whom both Mike Mills and Peter Buck are major fans.

Radiohead's Thom Yorke was going through a period of extreme depression during the late 1990s, which led to severe stage fright. Around that time, Yorke and Michael Stipe were close friends, and Stipe advised Yorke to tell himself: "I'm not here, this isn't happening" whenever he felt he was losing emotional control. This motto eventually became the chorus of Radiohead's "How to Disappear Completely", from Kid A (2000). In turn, this song supposedly inspired Stipe to write Reveals "Disappear". In a 2019 interview with NME, Stipe recounted telephoning Yorke after realizing the shared inspiration, apologizing for supposedly stealing the concept behind their song, only for Yorke to respond by stating that it was more R.E.M.'s song than Radiohead's upon hearing Stipe recite the lyrics to "Disappear".

The album's opening track, "The Lifting", is a prequel to "Daysleeper" from R.E.M.'s 1998 album, Up, and features the same character.

Critical reception 

Initial critical response to Reveal was positive ("Probably because it's more melodic than the one before," remarked Peter Buck). At Metacritic, which assigns a normalized rating out of 100 to reviews from mainstream critics, the album has received an average score of 76, based on 20 reviews. Q Magazine gave high praise to the album, awarded it the full 5 stars, and listed it as one of the best 50 albums of 2001. Kludge included it on their list of the 25 best albums of 2001.

With early comparisons to Automatic for the People, the critical reaction to Reveal was warmer than the notices which greeted Up in 1998, particularly in the UK, where it reached #1 with healthy sales, reaching platinum status there. In the United States, Reveal peaked at  6 (with 10 weeks on the Billboard 200) and was certified Gold (500,000 units). The album was also certified Gold in Canada (50,000 units) in 2001, and Gold in Germany (150,000 units).

In 2004, the German version of Rolling Stone ranked the album at number 483 in its list of the 500 greatest albums of all time.

In April 2021, almost exactly twenty years after the album's release, Michael Stipe stated that Reveal had possibly overtaken New Adventures in Hi-Fi in being his favorite R.E.M. album.

Track listing 
All songs written by Peter Buck, Mike Mills and Michael Stipe.

Chorus side
 "The Lifting" – 4:39
 "I've Been High" – 3:25
 "All the Way to Reno (You're Gonna Be a Star)" – 4:43
 "She Just Wants to Be" – 5:22
 "Disappear" – 4:11
 "Saturn Return" – 4:55

Ring side
"Beat a Drum" – 4:21
 "Imitation of Life" – 3:57
 "Summer Turns to High" – 3:31
 "Chorus and the Ring" – 4:31
 "I'll Take the Rain" – 5:51
 "Beachball" – 4:14

"The Lifting" mastering defect 
In 2002, Warner Bros. released a DVD-A version of Reveal containing a new 5.1-channel mix of the album as well as the stereo mix presented in "Advanced Resolution" 96 kHz/24-bit. The 96 kHz/24-bit mix, however, has a mastering defect. The defect takes place on the first track "The Lifting", in which the beat skips at the 0:29 mark. This defective DVD-A was used in the 2005 CD+DVD-A reissue, and the 96 kHz/24-bit mix is used on the HDtracks store as well as the iTunes Store and Apple Music service. In 2017, Apple removed "The Lifting" from the iTunes Store and Apple Music service due to the defect. In a 2018 Twitter post, Mike Mills acknowledged the defect as well as the removal and stated that the issue was noted and should be fixed soon. However, as of 2020, the defective version of "The Lifting" has been added back to iTunes and Apple Music and is still present on the HDtracks store.

Reveal Advance 2001 
The February 2001 master of Reveal differed from the March 2001 master of the album, which ended up being the final version. Compared to the official, the differences of the Reveal Advance 2001 disc include:
 Two tracks that never made it to the finished version: "Fascinating" and "Free Form Jazz Jam".
 An alternative version of "Beat a Drum" called "All I Want."
 A longer version of "Imitation of Life."
 A version of "All the Way to Reno (You're Gonna Be a Star)" with an alternate ending, and simply titled "Reno."
 Slightly different mixes and/or instrumental changes in "I've Been High" and "She Just Wants to Be."

Neither of the unreleased tracks or any of the alternative mixes have ever been released commercially. However, the band allowed the Murmurs.com fan community to offer downloads of "Fascinating," which had recently been covered by Fischerspooner. In September 2019, R.E.M. made a later version of the song "Fascinating" available to benefit global organization Mercy Corps' Hurricane Dorian relief and recovery efforts in the Bahamas; this version was rerecorded in 2004 at Nassau's Compass Point Studios.

Personnel 
R.E.M.
Peter Buck – guitar
Mike Mills – bass guitar, keyboards
Michael Stipe – vocals

Additional personnel
Chris Bilheimer – art
Pat McCarthy – production
Scott McCaughey – guitar
Ken Stringfellow – keyboards
Joey Waronker – drums and percussion

Charts

Weekly charts

Year-end charts

Certifications

See also
Not Bad for No Tour
r.e.m.IX

References 

2001 albums
Albums produced by Peter Buck
Albums produced by Mike Mills
Albums produced by Michael Stipe
Albums produced by Pat McCarthy (record producer)
Albums recorded at The Warehouse Studio
R.E.M. albums
Warner Records albums